The red-cheeked rope squirrel (Funisciurus leucogenys)  is a species of rodent in the family Sciuridae. It is found in Benin, Cameroon, Central African Republic, Equatorial Guinea, Ghana, Nigeria, and Togo. Its natural habitats are subtropical or tropical moist lowland forest and subtropical or tropical moist montane forest.

References

Funisciurus
Rodents of Africa
Mammals described in 1842
Taxonomy articles created by Polbot